Himavahini is a 1983 Indian Malayalam-language film, directed by P. G. Vishwambharan and produced by K. J. Joseph. The film stars Mammootty, Mohanlal, Jagathy Sreekumar and Adoor Bhasi. The film has musical score by G. Devarajan.

Cast
Mammootty as Gopi
Mohanlal as Pappi
Jagathy Sreekumar as Hamsa
Adoor Bhasi as Watcher
Ratheesh as Sekharan
Kalaranjini as Ponnamma
Prathapachandran as Hema's father
Achankunju as Panthalam Kurup
Shanthi Krishna as Hema
Thodupuzha Vasanthy as Hema's sister
Ranipadmini as Sainaba

Soundtrack
The music was composed by G. Devarajan and the lyrics were written by Poovachal Khader.

References

External links
 

1983 films
1980s Malayalam-language films
Films based on Malayalam novels
Films directed by P. G. Viswambharan